Isla del Pescado, Isla de los Pescadores or Cujiri is a hilly and rocky outcrop of land in the middle of Salar de Uyuni – a salt flat situated in the Daniel Campos Province, Tahua Municipality, Caquena Canton, Bolivia.

The local guides claim that the place took its name Isla del Pescado ("Island of the Fish") because when viewed from the distance it looks like a fish (see picture to the left).

See also 
 Inkawasi
 Uyuni

External links 
 Tahua Municipality: population data and map (also showing the islands of Inkawasi and Isla del Pescado

Islands of Bolivia
Landforms of Potosí Department